Amy Michelle Williams (née Gusso; born March 22, 1976) is the current head coach of the Nebraska women's basketball team. She was previously the head coach at the University of South Dakota, and led the Coyotes to the 2016 WNIT championship.

Early life and education
Born Amy Michelle Gusso in Spearfish, South Dakota, Williams graduated from Spearfish High School in 1993 and played 57 games as a reserve guard for the Nebraska Cornhuskers women's basketball team at the University of Nebraska–Lincoln from 1994 to 1998. Williams graduated from Nebraska in 1998 with a bachelor's degree in biology and mathematics.

Coaching career
From 1998 to 2000, Williams was a graduate assistant for the University of Nebraska at Kearney women's basketball team while studying for her master's degree in sports administration, which she completed in 2002. Williams was an assistant coach at UTSA in the 2000–01 season then at Oklahoma State from 2001 to 2005. From 2005 to 2007, Williams was an assistant at Tulsa. Williams helped Tulsa win the program's first regular season and tournament titles in Conference USA and NCAA tournament appearance in 2006.

Williams got her first head coaching job as the first women's basketball head coach at Rogers State University, an NAIA school in Claremore, Oklahoma, in 2007. In five seasons, Williams accumulated a 97–65 record and two NAIA Tournament appearances in 2011 and 2012 for the upstart Hillcats program.

In 2012, Williams returned to the NCAA Division I level as head coach at South Dakota. Williams went 96–44 in four seasons, all of which ended with postseason appearances, including the 2013 WBI semifinals, 2014 NCAA Tournament first round, and 2015 WNIT second round. The 2015–16 South Dakota team went 32–6 and won the 2016 WNIT.

On April 11, 2016, the University of Nebraska–Lincoln hired Williams as head women's basketball coach.

Head coaching record

References

1976 births
Living people
Basketball players from South Dakota
American women's basketball coaches
Nebraska Cornhuskers women's basketball coaches
Nebraska Cornhuskers women's basketball players
People from Spearfish, South Dakota
South Dakota Coyotes women's basketball coaches
University of Nebraska at Kearney alumni
Nebraska–Kearney Lopers women's basketball coaches
Rogers State Hillcats women's basketball coaches
UTSA Roadrunners women's basketball coaches
Oklahoma State Cowgirls basketball coaches
Tulsa Golden Hurricane women's basketball coaches
Basketball coaches from South Dakota
Guards (basketball)